The Sun Shines Bright is a collection of seventeen nonfiction science essays  by American writer and scientist Isaac Asimov. It was the fifteenth of a series of books collecting essays from The Magazine of Fantasy and Science Fiction. It was first published by Doubleday & Company in 1981.

Contents
The Sun
Out, Damned Spot!
The Sun Shines Bright
The Noblest Metal of Them All
The Stars
How Little?
Siriusly Speaking
Below the Horizon
The Planets
Just Thirty Years
The Moon
A Long Day's Journey
The Inconstant Moon
The Elements
The Useless Metal
Neutrality!
The Finger of God
The Cell
Clone, Clone of My Own
The Scientists
Alas, All Human
The People
The Unsecret Weapon
More Crowded!
Nice Guys Finish First!

Reception
Dave Langford reviewed The Sun Shines Bright for White Dwarf #44, and stated that "Each essay presents some interesting insight or viewpoint, usually scientific; most of them, alas, are padded and smothered with great wads of facts, statistics and numbers in general, the result being relatively dull."

Reviews
Review by David Langford [as by Dave Langford] (1983) in Paperback Inferno, Volume 7, Number 1

References

External links
Asimovonline.com

Essay collections by Isaac Asimov
1981 books
Works originally published in The Magazine of Fantasy & Science Fiction
Doubleday (publisher) books